Edward Seymour may refer to:

Seymour family, English aristocrats
Edward Seymour, 1st Duke of Somerset (c. 1500–1552), Lord Protector of England, 1547-49, during the minority of his nephew, Edward VI of England
Lord Edward Seymour (died 1593) (c. 1528–1593), Sheriff of Devon, second son of the above
Edward Seymour, 1st Earl of Hertford (1539–1621), fourth son of the Duke of Somerset
Edward Seymour, Lord Beauchamp (1561–1612), son of the above
Sir Edward Seymour, 1st Baronet (c. 1563–1613), English MP, son of Lord Edward Seymour
Sir Edward Seymour, 2nd Baronet (c. 1580–1659), English MP, son of the above
Sir Edward Seymour, 3rd Baronet (1610–1688), English MP, son of the above
Sir Edward Seymour, 4th Baronet (1633–1708), English statesman who served as Treasurer of the Navy during the First Danby Ministry, son of the above
Sir Edward Seymour, 5th Baronet (c. 1660–1741), English MP, son of the above
Edward Seymour, 8th Duke of Somerset (1695–1757), son of the above
Edward Seymour, 9th Duke of Somerset (1717–1792), son of the above
Edward St Maur, 11th Duke of Somerset (1775–1855), British landowner and amateur mathematician, grandson of the above
Edward Seymour, 12th Duke of Somerset (1805–1885), son of the above
Edward Seymour, 16th Duke of Somerset (1860–1931), great-great-great-grandson of the 8th Duke

Others
Edward Seymour (physician) (1796–1866), English physician, medical writer and cricketer
Edward Seymour (Vermont politician) (1810–1883), Vermont farmer, businessman and politician
Edward Woodruff Seymour (1832–1892), Connecticut state representative
Sir Edward Seymour (Royal Navy officer) (1840–1929), British admiral active during the Boxer Rebellion
Sir Edward Seymour (British Army officer) (1877–1948), British Army officer and courtier
Edward A. Seymour (1887–1965), Wisconsin State Assemblyman
Edward Seymour (Irish cricketer) (1906–1980), Irish cricketer